Lisa Lynn Harris is a Canadian politician, who was elected to the Legislative Assembly of New Brunswick in the 2014 provincial election. She represented the electoral district of Miramichi Bay-Neguac as a member of the Liberal Party. She resigned on August 17, 2021, to run federally in the riding of Miramichi—Grand Lake in the 2021 federal election, but was defeated by the Conservative candidate, Jake Stewart.

Harris served as provincial Minister of Seniors and Long-Term Care from 2016 to 2018. She was re-elected in the 2018 and 2020 provincial elections.

References

Living people
Members of the Executive Council of New Brunswick
New Brunswick Liberal Association MLAs
Women MLAs in New Brunswick
21st-century Canadian politicians
21st-century Canadian women politicians
Women government ministers of Canada
Year of birth missing (living people)